Palestinian rabbis encompasses all rabbis who lived in the region known as Palestine up until modern times, but most significantly refers to the early Jewish sages who dwelled in the ancient Holy Land and compiled the Mishna and its later commentary, the Jerusalem Talmud. These rabbis lived between 150 BCE and 400 CE and during the Talmudic and later Geonic period, they exerted influence over Syria and Egypt, while the authorities in Babylonia had held sway over the Jews of Iraq and Iran. While the Jerusalem Talmud was not to become authoritative against the Babylonian, the liturgy developed by Palestinian rabbis was later destined to form the foundation of the minhag of nearly all the Ashkenazic communities across Europe.

While the Jewish population of Palestine waned with the arrival of the Christian Crusaders in the 11th century, by the 16th century, rabbis in Palestine had again made the Land of Israel a centre of Jewish learning. So significant had the Jewish population become, a novel plan to revive the ancient "ordination" was attempted. Seen by the Ottoman authorities as a precursor to Jewish self-rule, the scheme did not materialise. Nevertheless, the high calibre of Palestinian rabbinical scholarship ensured that Judaism continued to flourish in the region.

Early Palestinian rabbis
Early rabbis, known as tannaim, were active in Palestine from around 150 BCE to 200 CE. After the destruction of the Temple in Jerusalem, Jewish scholars in Palestine came to accept the honorific "rabbi". During this period, they compiled the Mishna which was later expounded upon and recorded in the Jerusalem Talmud.

Rabbi Jochanan (c. 220–50 CE) was considered the greatest Palestinian amora of his time and according to Adin Steinsaltz, "the most glorious epoch of Palestinian learning" ensued when he was appointed rector of the Tiberias academy. The great sages in Babylonia saw him as the spiritual leader of the generation and many of them moved to Tiberias to study under him; indeed, some of the greatest Palestinian sages were originally Babylonians who had migrated to Palestine to further their studies. Rabbi Jochanan succeeded in turning his academy into the world's supreme centre focusing on the study of the oral law. It was common for a disputes which arose in Babylonia to be settled with "a letter from Palestine." The works of the Palestinian rabbis became the foundation for all Babylonian literary activity, so much so, that Palestinian traditions and teachings are to be found on nearly every page of the Babylonian Talmud. This transmission was made possible by scholars who travelled back and forth between the two centres.

According to recent scholarship, any influence wielded by the Palestinian rabbis during the second century was not due to an established hierarchal position, as they lacked any form of institutionalised power: no synagogues or other communal institutions were under their control. They were instead a "self-proclaimed elite" who achieved recognition based on their social position, which included wealth, learning, or charisma. While being approached for advice and guidance, most of the Palestinian rabbis never held any official authority and instead engaged in teaching a select group of students. This changed with the formation of the Patriarchate towards the end of the 2nd-century when some rabbis found employment at its various institutions. From the third century onwards, the circumstances of more and more rabbis continued to change, with many taking on formal positions as communal preachers, scribes or law court judges. During this period, Palestinian rabbis were especially concentrated in Lydda, Sepphoris, Tiberias, and Caesarea.

From the mid-fourth century onwards, Palestinian rabbis found themselves surrounded by an increasingly Christian orientated environment. It is commonly acknowledged that the Palestinian rabbis were in dialogue with Christians and other Hellenists. Most of the recorded instances of heretics (minim) using the Scripture to challenge rabbinic interpretations involve Palestinian rabbis. It has been suggested that Palestinian rabbis interacted more with the common folk than their Babylonian counterparts, to the extent that several Palestinian sources depict them "dining and partying together"; they were also on more familiar terms, addressing their fellow Palestinians as "my son" or "my daughter". They tended not to highlight the significant distinction between the two groups. A further indication of the Palestinian rabbis effort to strengthen bonds with the commoners is revealed by their willingness in approaching the wealthy among them for financial support. Other Palestinian rabbis were engaged in a range of livelihoods, including occupations as scribes, physicians, merchants, artisans, blacksmiths, builders and shoemakers.  Many also knew foreign languages, a necessity for appointment to the Sanhedrin.

The decentralisation of the Palestinian rabbinate occurred towards the end of Judah I's lifetime, when he allocated various roles to different rabbis. Soon after, rabbis began to dissociated themselves form the Patriarchate after the Patriarchs attempted to replace rabbis and integrate wealthy individuals into positions of authority. During the office of Gamaliel III (ca. 225–235), many prominent scholars established their own academies throughout the country. In 351, Roman commander Ursicinus, destroyed the chief Jewish communities of Palestine, including all seats of academies. In around 425, the office of the Jewish Patriarchate was abolished after a period of some 350 years.

Palestinian Gaonim and Masoretes
From the middle of the ninth century onwards, the rabbis of Palestine had established a structured central legalistic body representing the Jewish community. Based first in Tiberias and then in Jerusalem, the Palestinian Gaonate functioned for around 200 years, whereupon persecution led to its transfer to Tyre, Lebanon in 1071. When the Gaonate was exiled to Syria, the heads of the Fostat Gaonate regarded themselves as the heirs to the supposedly defunct Palestinian school and wished to inherit their rights. But the exiled Gaonate still expected the Egyptian Jews, as well as the Palestinian Jews who resided in Egypt, to acknowledge their leadership.

During this period, the Masoretes were active in compiling a system of pronunciation and grammatical guides of the Hebrew language. They also fixed the division of the Jewish Tanakh, regarded as authoritative till today. The centres of Masoretic activity in Palestine developed along the lines of the western or Palestinian tradition, distinguishable from the textual and vocalization systems which evolved in Babylonia.

One of the most notable rabbis of Palestine during the 13th century was Isaac of Acre, a Palestinian kabbalist who had to flee to Spain after the Siege of Acre in 1291. The names of some rabbis of the period have not been preserved, such as the anonymous Palestinian author of Sha'arei Tzedek (written c. 1290–1295).

Attempt to revive ordination

With the advent of the 16th century, hopes of the arrival of the Messiah intensified. A rabbi from Safed, Jacob Berab, believed the time was ripe to reintroduce the old "semikah" (ordination) which would create for the Jews a recognised central authority on subjects relating to the comprehension and interpretation of the Torah. Modelled on the Sanhedrin, the requirement for ordination was a necessity, but proved an obstacle as the procedure had fallen into disuse. With the backing of the scholars at Safed, Berab wished to rely on the opinion of Maimonides, that if all Palestinian rabbis agreed to ordain one of themselves, they could do so, and that the man of their choice could then ordain others, thereby recreating the chain of semikah transmission. In 1538, Berab was ordained by an assembly of twenty-five rabbis meeting at Safed. This ordination conferred upon him the right to ordain others, until they could form a Sanhedrin. Initially there was little opposition when Berab argued that his ordination was legal from a Talmudic standpoint. However, circumstances changed when Berab ordained the chief rabbi at Jerusalem, Levi ben Jacob ibn Habib, who had for many years been his personal opponent. ibn Habib considered it an insult to himself and to Jerusalem that the scholars of Safed had undertaken to resume the practice of ordination without consulting with the scholars of Jerusalem. He wrote to the scholars of Safed, explaining his objections to their proceeding, which he considered illegal, and asserting that their action was a threat to rabbinical Judaism because a new Sanhedrin might use its authority to alter the calendar. The conflict between the two rabbis was not beneficial to the success of the scheme. A more serious setback occurred when it became apparent that the Turkish authorities regarded ordination of rabbis as the first step toward the restoration of the Jewish state. Berab was either deported or escaped to Egypt following threats to his life. He ordained four rabbis before his departure, in the hope that they could continue to exercise the function of ordination during his absence. When Berab returned, ibn Habib's following had increased, and Berab's ordination plan was doomed. The dispute among Palestinian scholars over ordination ended with Berab's death some years later.

The four men that Berab ordained included Joseph ben Ephraim Karo, Moses di Trani, and possibly also Abraham Shalom and Israel di Curiel. Karo used his status to ordain Moses Alshich, who later ordained Hayyim Vital.

Rabbinic scholarship flourishes
The 16th–17th centuries saw a resurgence of Jewish activity in Palestine. It is probable that Palestinian rabbis were involved in assisting Joseph Nasi with his plan of settling Jews in the Galilee in 1561. Palestinian rabbis were also instrumental producing a universally accepted manual of Jewish law and some of the most beautiful liturgical poems. They are also credited with developing a new method of understanding the kabbalah, especially that espoused by Palestinian mystic Isaac Luria. Palestinian scholars of this period whose Responsa merit mention are:
Jacob Berab (1474–1546), Venice, 1663.
Levi ibn Habib (1480?–1545), Venice, 1565; Lemberg, 1865.
Moses di Trani (1505–85), Venice, 1629; Lemberg, 1861.
Joseph di Trani, Constantinople, 1641; Venice, 1645; Lemberg, 1861.
Joseph Karo (1488–1575), Lemberg, 1811 and another collection titled Abkath Rokhel, Salonica, 1791; Leipzig, 1859.
Joseph ben David ibn Leb (16th century), vols. 1–3, Constantinople, 1560–73; vol. 4, Kure Tshesme, 1595, Furth, 1692; the complete work in 4 vols., Amsterdam, 1726.
Moses Alshech (16th century), Venice, 1605, Slonek (Berlin), 1681? Lemberg, 1889.
Yom-Tov ben Moses Zahalon (1557–1638?), Venice, 1694.

Joseph Karo's comprehensive guide to Jewish law, the Shulchan Aruch, was considered so authoritative that the variant customs of German-Polish Jewry were merely added as supplement glosses. Some of the most celebrated hymns were written in Safed by poets such as Israel Najara and Solomon Alkabetz. The town was also a centre of Jewish mysticism, notable kabbalists included Moses Cordovero and the German-born Naphtali Hertz ben Jacob Elhanan.
During the 17th century, a messianic fervour developed and spread. Several scholars publicised a novel interpretation of a passage in the Zohar, an ancient mystical text, which predicted that the Messiah would arrive in 1648. A special prayer composed by Palestinian rabbis was sent to all Jewish communities worldwide to induce the Messianic advent. It asked for God to restore the Davidic monarchy and requested the "cultivation of peace and good will" among one another.

The writings of later Palestinian rabbis are still used by contemporary authorities. 20th-century Immanuel Jakobovits, Chief Rabbi of the United Hebrew Congregations of the Commonwealth, cites 17th-century Moses ibn Habib in his halachic work on medical ethics.

Charitable activism

Palestinian rabbis were actively involved in raising funds for their communities in the Holy Land. One of the earliest records of this is an 11th-century appeal made to the Jews of Fostat from the Gaon Solomon the Younger. It requested funds to help alleviate the heavy tax burden placed upon the Jews of Jerusalem. By the 17th century, the dispatchment of a meshulach had become a permanent feature of the yishuv. A prominent Palestinian rabbi of the 18th century was Raphael Hayyim Isaac Carigal (1733–1777) of Hebron. He travelled to many countries as an emissary of the Four Holy Cities. In 1755, Palestinian rabbi Chaim Joseph David Azulai visited London to collect funds for the Hebron yeshiva. The first Palestinian emissary to visit North America was Sephardi rabbi Moses Malki of Safed who arrived in 1759. In the early 1820s, Palestinian rabbis on missions to Amsterdam, London and New York established charitable societies that solicited funds for Jewish communities in the Holy Land. In 1846, Rabbi Yehiel Cohen of Jerusalem pleaded with the Jews of New York to send support the Jews of Hebron who were suffering from famine. In Morocco during the late 19th-century, legends evolved around tombs which supposedly belonged to Palestinian rabbis who had died there while on their fundraising missions. One such venerated Palestinian saint was 18th-century Rabbi Amram ben Diwan, whose tomb in Ouazzane is the site of annual pilgrimage. In 1839, Palestinian rabbis concerned with the economic problems of their communities, petitioned philanthropist Moses Montefiore for assistance in helping them develop the land for agricultural production. Yet charitable activity on the part of Palestinian rabbis was not limited to Palestine alone. In 1943, in conjunction with the American Vaad Hatzalah Rescue Committee, a committee of distinguished Palestinian rabbis and roshei yeshiva  tried to send relief packages to Torah scholars in the Soviet Union.

Land of Israel Rabbinate
A list of List of Sephardi chief rabbis of the Land of Israel exists from the mid-17th century onwards. They were known as the "Rishon LeZion" (lit. "First to Zion"), and Moses Galante, one of the leading Talmudic scholars in Jerusalem who died in 1689, was the first officially chief rabbi recognised by the Ottoman sultan.

In 1918, chairman of the Zionist Commission Chaim Weizmann, attempted to create a unified religious authority for the country. In April 1920, an assembly in Jerusalem of around 60 rabbis failed to agree on the matter. In 1920, Sir Herbert Samuel, high commissioner of the British Mandate government, again convened a committee to consider the creation of a united Chief Rabbinate. While Yosef Chaim Sonnenfeld opposed the idea because it included laymen and secularists, Abraham Isaac Kook responded with great enthusiasm. He saw it as an opportunity to introduce order and discipline into society and also viewed the establishment of the Palestinian Rabbinate as the fulfilment of the prophetic promise. In 1921 Kook was appointed the first Palestinian chief rabbi for the Ashkenazi community, a position which he held until his death in 1935. Yitzhak HaLevi Herzog succeeded him as Chief Rabbi of the Land of Israel, until the State of Israel was created in 1948.

See also
Ezras Torah Fund for Relief of European and Palestinian Rabbis
Palestinian Jews

Notes

Bibliography

 
History of Palestine (region)
Rabbis by region
Mishnah rabbis